The Central Europe Cup is an international cricket tournament played annually in Prague, Czech Republic, between invited teams from across central Europe. Organized by the Czech Cricket Union, and played at the Vinoř Cricket Ground, the tournament was first held in 2014 as a 50-over tournament and retained this format until it was changed to Twenty20 in 2019. As of 2022, Czech Republic and Poland have won the tournament on the most occasions (three times).

Poland won the inaugural event in 2014, finishing ahead of Switzerland on the basis of their head-to-head record after the two teams ended the tournament level on points. The Poles retained the title in 2015. The 2016 tournament featured only three teams, with Poland not featuring, and was won by the hosts for the first time. Poland returned in 2017 and won the tournament for a third time. Switzerland claimed the title in 2018 winning all three of their matches.

The Czechs won the 2019 edition, defeating Hungary in the final. The 2020 edition was scheduled to take place in September and would have been the first to have official Twenty20 International (T20I) status since the International Cricket Council granted this status to all eligible matches played between its Members from January 2019. The 2020 edition would also have included more teams that previous editions, with six national teams taking part – Austria, Belgium, Hungary, Luxembourg, Malta, and the hosts Czech Republic. However, the tournament was cancelled on 14 September 2020 due to a worsening of the COVID-19 pandemic in the region. 

The 2021 edition was played in Prague between 21 and 23 May 2021. The participating teams were the hosts Czech Republic, along with Austria and Luxembourg. Malta were also due to take part, but were forced to withdraw due to COVID-19 restrictions. This was the seventh edition of the Central Europe Cup and the first to have T20I status. Austria won the tournament for the first time.

Results

Performance by team
Legend
 – Champions
 – Runners-up
 – Third place
Q – Qualified

References

International cricket competitions
Twenty20 International cricket competitions